Le Dorat is a commune in the Haute-Vienne department in the Nouvelle-Aquitaine region in western France. It is considered to be the traditional capital of the Basse Marche. Inhabitants are known as Dorachons. Some say that Le Dorat owes its name to the gilded angel located at the summit of the "Lou Dora" bell tower.

Geography
The town is located 50 km north of Limoges. The river Brame forms part of the commune's northwestern border. There is one SNCF train station on the line Limoges-Poitiers that connects the town to Paris.

History
In the year 950, missionaries reconstructed a church dedicated to the Saint Michel. 20 years later, the Saint Pierre chapel and the chapitre du Dorat were founded near the church Saint Michel. During the Medieval period, the Saint Pierre chapel was known for its veneration of King St. Clovis.

Le Dorat was a town of nobility and property owners. In 1356, the town was besieged by the Prince of Wales and during the European wars of religion from 1524 to 1648, the town was badly damaged.

Sights
Le Dorat is an ancient town, with fine examples of Romanesque architecture, especially the 11th Century Collegiate of Saint-Pierre.

Events
There is plenty to do all year round with horse racing events in June, July and August; a national horse show in September; sound and light show; craft days; Christmas market as well as concerts, tennis, cinema, fishing, sailing and windsurfing.
In 2019 le Dorat hosted the World Sheep Shearing Championship.

See also
Communes of the Haute-Vienne department

Further reading
 Guillaume Lavaud, Le dossier hagiographique des saints Israël et Théobald du Dorat, "Saint Israël, chanoine de l’An Mil - Etablissements canoniaux, pouvoir épiscopal et seigneuries laïques au temps des premiers Capétiens, Limousin et royaume de France", international colloquium organised by Université de Limoges and the CRIHAM, November 2014, Limoges-Le Dorat, France. Éd. Lavaud, 2020.

References
Town Website
Central Town Cafe/Bar

Communes of Haute-Vienne
County of La Marche